Mereșeni is a commune in Hînceşti District, Moldova. It is composed of two villages, Mereșeni and Sărata-Mereșeni.

References

Communes of Hîncești District